HVS 7 -- hyper-velocity star 7, otherwise known as SDSS J113312.12+010824.9 is a rare star that has been accelerated to faster than our Milky Way Galaxy's escape velocity.  In 2013 a team under N. Przybilla wrote that the star had a chemically peculiar photosphere, which masked its origins.  The star was first cataloged during the Sloan Digital Sky Survey.  It was identified as a hyper-velocity star in 2006.

The star has a chemically peculiar spectrum, roughly matching a B-type subdwarf.  Stars in this region of the Hertzsprung–Russell diagram are expected to either be hot horizontal branch stars, low-mass helium-burning objects, or moderate mass hydrogen-burning stars slightly below the main sequence.  The high rotational velocity of HVS 7 means it is likely to be a young star near the main sequence, around 150 million years old and 3.7 times the mass of the sun.

References

Hypervelocity stars
Leo (constellation)
B-type subdwarfs
?